The Federal Polytechnic, Kaltungo is a Nigeria federal government-owned higher institution located in Kaltungo, a local government area in Gombe State, North-Eastern Nigeria and one of the eight (8) newly established Polytechnics in Nigeria.

History 
Federal polytechnic, Kaltungo was established with the Federal Polytechnic Establishment Act of 2019 and it is currently running its academic activities on a take-off site at the premise of Model School in Kaltungo. However, the community has allocated double of the parcel of land, 100 hectares of land, instead of the 50 hectares of land requested by the government for the permanent site.

Faculties/Schools

A. School of Engineering 
I. National Diploma in Electrical and Electronics Engineering Technology:

II. National Diploma in Computer engineering Technology,

B. School of Science and Technology 
III. National Diploma in Science Laboratory Technology:

IV. National Diploma in Computer science,

V. National Diploma in Statistics,

VI. National Diploma in Leisure and Tourism Management;

C. School of Management Studies 
VII. National Diploma in Accountancy

VIII. National Diploma in Business Administration and Management;

IX. National Diploma in Public administration.

D. School of General Studies 
X National Diploma in Crime Management and

XI. National Diploma in Library and Information science.

Governing councils 

On the 11th January, 2022, the Federal Government of Nigeria via the Minister of Education, Adamu Adamu, announces the inauguration of the Governing Councils of eight newly Federal Polytechnics founded by the President, Major General  Muhammadu Buhari(retd.) led administration.

Below are the list of the governing councils of the polytechnic

Mr. L. Micah Kamat can( Chairman )

Dr Lydia Umar (Member)

Abdul Maizabi (Member)

Mr Jide Akinleye (Member)

Labour M. Lele (Member)

Principal officers

The pioneer rector of the school is Dr Muhammad Suleiman Lame who got the position after serving as the rector of abubakar tatari Alli polytechnic in bauchi state.

Educational background

Dr Suleiman went to Lame primary school after which he went to darazo Government secondary school. He had his first degree, Masters and PhD at Bayero University, Unijos and University of Tunn Malaysia respectively.

Admission process 
The jamb cut-off mark for applicants was pegged at 160 and above as at last year with the post Utme 50% meaning that anyone who scored 50/100 were considered for admission.

The final admission cut-off mark was derived from o'level grades, jamb and post-utme score which were all dependent on admission quota for each department

References 

Schools in Gombe State
Federal polytechnics in Nigeria